Pierre-Joseph-Guillaume Zimmerman (17 March 178529 October 1853), known as Pierre Zimmermann and Joseph Zimmermann, was a French pianist, composer, and music teacher.

Biography
Zimmerman was born in Paris on March 19, 1785, as the son of a piano maker.  He attended the Paris Conservatory in 1798, studying piano with François-Adrien Boieldieu; while a student there, he won first prizes for piano in 1800 (Friedrich Kalkbrenner came second) and harmony in 1802. He would later study under Luigi Cherubini. Zimmerman became a piano assistant at the Conservatory in 1811 and a full professor there in 1816, serving until 1848; he refused a position as a professor of counterpoint and fugue in 1821. Among his students were Charles Gounod (who married one of his daughters), Georges Bizet, César Franck, Charles-Valentin Alkan, Ambroise Thomas, Louis Lacombe, Alexandre Goria and Lefébure-Wély. In 1842 he denied Conservatory admission to 13-year old Louis Moreau Gottschalk without an audition on account of Gottschalk's American nationality, commenting that "America is a country of steam engines".  Zimmerman was often assisted in his teaching by Gounod.

Zimmerman wrote two operas, L'enlèvement (Opéra-Comique, 1830) and Nausicaa (never staged). He also composed two piano concertos, one piano sonata, and numerous other works for piano. His most important legacy is considered his Encyclopédie du pianiste, a complete method of piano playing, including a treatise on harmony and counterpoint.

He died in Paris on October 29, 1853, at the age of 68, and is now buried in the Auteuil Cemetery in the 16th arrondissement.

His daughter Juliette married Édouard Dubufe.

References

Sources

Don Randel, The Harvard Biographical Dictionary of Music. Harvard, 1996, p. 1010-1011.

External links
Alkan-Zimmerman International Music Association
Alkan-Zimmerman International Piano Competition
Cimetières de France et ailleurs: Cimetière d’Auteuil, brief biography of Zimmerman and photo of his grave

1785 births
1853 deaths
French male classical composers
French Romantic composers
19th-century French male classical pianists
French music educators
Piano pedagogues
French opera composers
Male opera composers
Academic staff of the Conservatoire de Paris
Conservatoire de Paris alumni
19th-century classical composers
19th-century French composers